The Association of British Muslims (AoBM) is an organisation of British Muslims, initially founded in 1889 by Shaykh Abdullah Quilliam.

History
The Association of British Muslims began in Liverpool, England as the English Islamic Association, founded by Abdullah Quilliam, a 19th-century convert to Islam who opened one of England's first mosques during the same year,  at about the same time that the Shah Jahan Mosque was built. AoBM changed their name to the British Muslim Society in 1914 and to the Western Islamic Association in 1924. It declined in the late 1940s, was opposed by nationality-based organisations of British Muslims in 1969, and became the Association of British Muslims in 1975. The name Association for British Muslims was also used for sometime after 1978.

Leadership
, Shaykh Daoud Rosser-Owen was Amir of AoBM. , Paul Salahuddin Armstrong and Mohammed Abbasi were the Co-Directors of AoBM.

Public statements

Minority rights
In late 2010, the United Nations General Assembly Resolution on Extrajudicial, Summary or Arbitrary Executions, which previously opposed executions for several types of discrimination, including sexual orientation, was changed by the General Assembly to no longer exclude sexual-orientation based executions. AoBM criticised the change, stating, "Removing this clause at this time will send quite the wrong signal to those regimes that indulge in these barbaric practices, implying as it does that United Nations is no longer concerned at the maltreatment of people because of their sexual orientation or considers it to be a lesser matter." The Gay and Lesbian Humanist Association supported the AoBM's statement.

In February 2011, AoBM criticised homophobic stickers that appeared in East London. Co-director Paul Salahuddin Armstrong stated, "There is nothing in the Qur'an against LGBT people. Allah has honoured every son/daughter of Adam, so such a hateful message is not only morally and ethically wrong but actually unislamic."

Freedom of speech
In February 2012, AoBM called for King Abdullah of Saudi Arabia to drop charges of blasphemy laid against Hamza Kashgari for three tweets that he published, stating "Thought crime is no crime at all, ... Any state enforced penalty for perceived blasphemy runs contrary to the true spirit of Islam, and of our Prophet, peace be upon him, who was compassionate even to those who scorned him. ... No one should be legally prosecuted, imprisoned or detained for simply expressing themselves."

References

External links
http://www.aobm.org/
https://www.facebook.com/aobm.org?ref=ts

Islamic organisations based in the United Kingdom
1889 establishments in the United Kingdom
Religious organizations established in 1889